This is a list of battalions of the Argyll and Sutherland Highlanders (Princess Louise's), which existed as an infantry regiment of the British Army from 1881 to 2006.

Original composition
When the 91st (Argyllshire Highlanders) Regiment of Foot amalgamated with the 93rd (Sutherland Highlanders) Regiment of Foot, to become Princess Louise's (Sutherland and Argyll Highlanders) in 1881 under the Cardwell-Childers reforms of the British Armed Forces, nine pre-existent militia and volunteer battalions of Argyllshire, Buteshire, Dumbartonshire, Kinross-shire, Renfrewshire, and Stirlingshire were integrated into the structure of the regiment. Volunteer battalions had been created in reaction to a perceived threat of invasion by France in the late 1850s. Organised as "rifle volunteer corps", they were independent of the British Army and composed primarily of the middle class.

Reorganisation

The Territorial Force (later Territorial Army) was formed in 1908, which the volunteer battalions joined, while the militia battalions transferred to the "Special Reserve". All volunteer battalions were renumbered to create a single sequential order.

First World War

The Argyll and Sutherland Highlanders fielded 27 battalions and lost over 6,900 officers and other ranks during the course of the war. The regiment's territorial components formed duplicate second and third line battalions. As an example, the battalions of the 5th Argyll and Sutherland Highlanders were numbered as the 1/5th, 2/5th, and 3/5th respectively, with the 3rd line battalion becoming reserve battalions later on in the war. The Volunteer Training Corps were raised with overage or reserved occupation men early in the war, and were initially self-organised into many small corps, with a wide variety of names. Recognition of the corps by the authorities brought regulation and as the war continued the small corps were formed into battalion sized units of the county Volunteer Regiment. In 1918 these were linked to county regiments.

Between the wars
By 1921, all of the regiment's war-raised battalions had disbanded. The Argyll and Sutherland Highlanders did not, however, return to its original peacetime size; two of its territorial battalions were amalgamated shortly after the war ended. The Special Reserve reverted to its militia designation in 1921, then to the Supplementary Reserve in 1924; however, its battalions were effectively placed in 'suspended animation'. As World War II approached, the Territorial Army was reorganised in the mid-1930s and many of its infantry battalions were converted to other roles, especially anti-aircraft.

Second World War
The regiment's expansion during the Second World War was modest compared to 1914–1918. National Defence Companies were combined to create a new "Home Defence" battalion, and in addition to this, three battalions of the Home Guard were affiliated to the regiment, wearing its cap badge.

Post-World War II

In the immediate post-war period, the army was significantly reduced: nearly all infantry regiments had their first and second battalions amalgamated and the Supplementary Reserve disbanded.

Strategic Defence Review

Prior to amalgamation

The Argyll and Sutherland Highlanders, was amalgamated with the Royal Scots, King's Own Scottish Borderers, Royal Highland Fusiliers, Black Watch, and the Highlanders (Seaforth, Gordons and Camerons), to form the Royal Regiment of Scotland in 2006, under Delivering Security in a Changing World. The 1st battalion became the 5th Battalion, Royal Regiment of Scotland.

References

Argyll and Sutherland Highlanders
Argyll and Sutherland Highlanders, List of battalions
Argyll and Sutherland Highlanders
Argyll and Sutherland Highlanders
Battalions